The Carthage Firebirds football program, previously known as Redmen and more recently as Red Men, with the change to "Firebirds" occurring on February 19, 2021, is a college football team that represents Carthage College in the College Conference of Illinois and Wisconsin, a part of NCAA Division III.  The team has had 22 head coaches since its first recorded football game in 1895. The current coach is Dustin Hass, who first took the position for the 2018 season.

Key

Coaches
Statistics correct as of the end of the 2022 college football season.

table reference

Notes

Table header notes

Table content notes

References

Carthage Red Men

Carthage Red Men head coaches